Lee Kiat Lee (born 23 June 1975) is a Malaysian politician for the Malaysian Chinese Association (MCA), in Malaysia. He is also an advocate and solicitor by profession.

Biography
Born on 23 June 1975 in Melaka, Lee Kiat Lee is the eldest son of Mr Lee Han Kiong who is a former housing contractor and runs a food and beverage business called “Wang Food Court” in Pengkalan Rama within Dun Duyong from 1994 to 2009. Kiat Lee’s mother, Mdm Chong Ah Lan, is the director of a housing developer company, Chong Woo Yit Sdn Bhd in Malim, Melaka. Kiat Lee has two sisters. In year 2000, follows his father footstep, Kiat Lee also ventures in food and beverage business and opened a restaurant “Jit Seng Vegetarian” in Melaka Raya, Melaka.

Education
Lee Kiat Lee started his early education stage in Sekolah Jenis Kebangsaan (C) Siang Lin in Durian Daun, Melaka which he then continues and completed his secondary education in Pay Fong High School Melaka in 1993. In 1994, Kiat Lee studied Law in HELP University, formally known as Help Institute and, subsequently as HELP University College in Kuala Lumpur. He continue to pursue his Law is University of Glamorgan in South Wales, United Kingdom. After Wales in 1998, Kiat Lee continues with his CLP back in University of Malaya and done his reading in Chamber in a prominent firm in Melaka in 1999. In 2001, Kiat Lee qualified as an Advocate & Solicitor of High Courts (Malaysia) and practiced as a Legal Assistant until 2006. Since 2006, Lee founded and started his own legal firm with a partner in the name Messrs “Chia & Lee”

Marriage and children
Kiat Lee is married to Leong How Luan. The couple have three sons.

Political background
Kiat Lee started to be active in politics when he joined as a Malaysian Chinese Association (MCA) member in 2003. In 2004, Kiat Lee assisted YB Wong Nai Chee who was the candidate of Barisan National in 2004 General Election for constituency Kota Melaka (P138). Lee has assisted YB Wong Nai Chee in work and planning in MCA party. In 2008, Kiat Lee himself contested in DUN Kota Laksamana, Melaka under MCA party ticket against Betty Chew from DAP party. Since 2006, Kiat Lee is the Chairman of Jalan Tun Tan Cheng Lock MCA Branch in Melaka. He is also the Chief for Legal Aid Bureau MCA Youth Melaka and MCA Division Kota Melaka. Beside that, Kiat Lee is also the Legal Advisor for MCA Melaka Crisis Relief Squad and MCA Melaka Public Complain Bureau.

In 2008, Kiat Lee, a new candidate at that time, was defeated by Betty Chew for the Kota Laksamana seat where he had only 3,801 votes against 11,043 votes with Chew. Even though Kiat Lee had lost, he said that he had learned a lot through that election. He has discovered a way to enrich people's life through his own experience in the election and ways to deal with greater pressure.

Social service background
 Former President of Persatuan Penduduk-penduduk Taman ASEAN, Melaka
 Deputy Chief of Chinese Assembly Hall, Youth
 Advisor of Lee Association, both Mother Body and Youth Section, Melaka
 First Class Performer of Persatuan Seni Pertuturan (Cross talk) Cina Malaysia.
 Committee member of Persatuan Seni Pertuturan Cina Malaysia.
 Coach of Multimedia University Cross Talk class.
 Committee member of Pay Fong High School Alumni, Melaka
 Deputy Chief Lam Ann Association, youth section
 Legal advisor of temple Seck Kia Eenh
 Legal advisor of Judo Association, Melaka
 Legal advisor of Pertubuhan Belia Nian Shao Qing, Melaka
 Legal Advisor of Melaka Line Dance Association.
 Auditor of Alumni S.R.J.K (c) Siang Lin.
 Secretary for Persatuan Ahklak Chi Kak Kok, Melaka.
 Member for the Board of Director for S.R.J.K (c) Yu Ying, Semabok
 Legal Advisor for Tokong Lian Puan Gong, Semabok
 Legal Advisor for Tae Kwon Do (MGTF), Melaka
 Legal Advisor for Tae Kwon Do ( MGTF), Daerah Melaka Tengah
 Legal Advisor for Persatuan Bulan Sabit Merah Cabang 63, Melaka
 Legal Advisor for Persatuan St. john, cabang Kubu, Melaka Tengah
 Legal Advisor for many temples in many places of Melaka
 Popularly invited as M.C or performing cross talk show for many functions (more than 100 events since year 2000) in and out of Melaka and Malaysia.
 Organising Chairman for Youth Buddhist Association Malaysia 2017 Dharma
 Organising Chairman for Chinese Assembly Hall 2017 3399 cultural event in Bukit Cina
 Acted in two local movies name Bird House and Filial. The movie has qualified for four international movie festival finalist in the year of 2007. Whereas the short movie “Filial” is very commonly blasted for education purpose, it reach fifty thousand plus view in YouTube since 2007 till todate.

Election results

References

1975 births
Living people
Malaysian Chinese Association politicians